Hans Berger (28 February 1938 – 6 October 2022) was a German trade unionist and politician of the Social Democratic Party (SPD). From 1990 to 1998, he served in the Bundestag and served as the chairman of the Union of Mining and Energy (IGBE). Most recently, he was a member of the IG Bergbau, Chemie, Energie (IGBCE).

Biography
Early in his apprenticeship, he became involved in trade unions such as the IGBE and the IGBCE. In 1949, he joined the Socialist Youth of Germany – Falcons. In 1957, he was elected secretary and later chairman of the local IGBE group in Alsdorf. In 1961, he was elected to the works council of the Grube Anna.

In 1978, he was appointed district manager of the IGBE in Saarland. In 1984, he was elected to the executive committee, the second presidency in 1988, and presidency of the IGBE in 1990. During his tenure as president, he helped to orchestrate the merger between the IGBE, the Chemical, Paper and Ceramic Union, and the Leather Union.

Political career
Berger joined the SPD in 1957. He served on the District Council of Aachen from 1972 to 1978 and held numerous positions within the party organization. From 1990 to 1998, he served in the Bundestag, where he worked on the Economic Committee and the Social Policy Committee. He was elected via the state list in North Rhine-Westphalia.

Death
Hans Berger died in Saarbrücken on 6 October 2022, at the age of 84.

Awards
Commander's Cross of the Order of Merit of the Federal Republic of Germany

Honorary professor of the Technische Hochschule Georg Agricola

References

1938 births
2022 deaths
Social Democratic Party of Germany politicians
Members of the Bundestag
Members of the Bundestag for North Rhine-Westphalia
Commanders Crosses of the Order of Merit of the Federal Republic of Germany
People from Aachen (district)